Guaira may refer to:
 Guayrá, a former region of the Spanish Empire in what is now modern Paraguay and Brazil
 Guaíra Falls, former waterfalls on the Paraná River along the border between Brazil and Paraguay
 Brazil
 Guaíra, Paraná
 Guaíra Airport
 Guaíra, São Paulo
 Paraguay
 Guairá Department
 Salto del Guairá, Canindeyú Department
 Venezuela
 La Guaira, the capital city of the Venezuelan state of Vargas and the country's chief port